Epinotia subsequana is a species of moth belonging to the family Tortricidae.

It is native to Europe.
The forewings are fuscous, posteriorly ferruginous tinged. The costa is strigulated with whitish and dark fuscous. The basal patch has an obtusely angulated edge , and the central fascia is dilated in disc. Both are mixed with dark fuscous . The  ocellus is edged with leaden metallic, including several black dashes. The hindwings are white base  with the veins, termen, and an apical patch grey.The larva is yellowish green; head and plate of 2 black.

The larvae feed on Abies alba.

References

External links
lepiforum.de

Eucosmini
Moths described in 1811